Rossbach was a wolfpack of German U-boats that operated during the battle of the Atlantic in World War II.

Service history

Rossbach was formed in October 1943 to operate  against the North Atlantic convoy routes and comprised 21 boats.
It consisted of 12 boats from the disbanded group Leuthen, plus 9 others from bases in France and Germany.

Whilst forming, several boats from Rossbach were found and attacked by air patrols;  4 were sunk (and ) and another 4 were damaged (and ), forcing them to return to base.
A further 3 were damaged, but were able to continue, while 2 more boats arrived from base as re-inforcement.

On 8/9 October 1943  Rossbach, attacked convoy SC 143.

Rossbach was disbanded following this attack; the remaining boats formed the core of a new group, codenamed Schlieffen.

U-boats involved

The name

Rossbach was a reference to the Battle of Rossbach fought by Frederick the Great during the Seven Years' War.

References
 Jak P M Showell U-Boat Warfare: The Evolution of the Wolf-Pack  (2002)

External links

Wolfpacks of 1943